Maintirano Airport is an airport in Maintirano, Melaky Region, Madagascar .

Airlines and destinations

References

Airports in Madagascar
Melaky